The canton of Vercors-Monts du Matin is an administrative division of the Drôme department, southeastern France. It was created at the French canton reorganisation which came into effect in March 2015. Its seat is in Chatuzange-le-Goubet.

It consists of the following communes:
 
Barbières
La Baume-d'Hostun
Beauregard-Baret
Bésayes
Bouvante
Le Chaffal
La Chapelle-en-Vercors
Charpey
Chatuzange-le-Goubet
Échevis
Eymeux
Hostun
Jaillans
Léoncel
Marches
La Motte-Fanjas
Oriol-en-Royans
Rochechinard
Rochefort-Samson
Saint-Agnan-en-Vercors
Sainte-Eulalie-en-Royans
Saint-Jean-en-Royans
Saint-Julien-en-Vercors
Saint-Laurent-en-Royans
Saint-Martin-en-Vercors
Saint-Martin-le-Colonel
Saint-Nazaire-en-Royans
Saint-Thomas-en-Royans
Saint-Vincent-la-Commanderie
Vassieux-en-Vercors

References

Cantons of Drôme